The Town of Fraser is a Statutory Town located in Grand County, Colorado, United States. The town population was 1,400 at the 2020 United States Census, a +14.38% increase since the 2010 United States Census. The town is situated in Middle Park in the valley of the Fraser River along U.S. Highway 40. Its location northwest of Winter Park, the location of a popular ski resort, has provided growth in recent years with new condominium and other real estate developments.

History
Fraser was incorporated in 1953. A post office called Fraser has been in operation since 1876. The town derives its name from Reuben Frazer, a pioneer settler.

Geography
It is bordered to the south by the town of Winter Park and to the north by unincorporated Tabernash. U.S. Route 40 leads south and east across Berthoud Pass  to Denver, and northwest  to Granby, the largest town in Grand County.

At the 2020 United States Census, the town had a total area of  including  of water. The Fraser River passes through the east side of town, flowing northward toward the Colorado River.

Climate
It can and does get frost year-round, totaling 287.3 nights under , rivalled only by towns in northern Alaska and Bodie, California, among currently inhabited localities in the United States. The total of 63.4 nights under  is also among the highest in the contiguous 48 states, but the 59.9 days with highs not topping freezing is exceeded by substantial areas of North Dakota, Minnesota, northern Wisconsin and the Upper Peninsula of Michigan. Both Fraser and International Falls, Minnesota, have claimed the title "Icebox of the Nation", which has caused conflict between the two towns over the years.

According to the Köppen climate classification system, Fraser has a subarctic climate, abbreviated Dfc on climate maps.

A freeze has been recorded for every single date of the year, one of the only locations in the entire United States to hold that record.

Icebox of the Nation

Fraser, Colorado has been in a dispute with International Falls, Minnesota since 1956 over use of the trademark "Icebox of the Nation." After several years of legal battles, the United States Patent and Trademark Office officially registered the slogan with International Falls on January 29, 2008.

Demographics

As of the census of 2000, there were 910 people, 410 households, and 191 families residing in the town. The racial makeup of the town was 94.51% White, 0.88% African American, 0.88% Native American, 0.88% Asian, 0.22% Pacific Islander, 1.10% from other races, and 1.54% from two or more races. Hispanic or Latino of any race were 3.30% of the population.

There were 410 households, out of which 25.1% had children under the age of 18 living with them, 33.2% were married couples living together, 9.0% had a female householder with no husband present, and 53.2% were non-families. 27.6% of all households were made up of individuals, and 3.2% had someone living alone who was 65 years of age or older. The average household size was 2.21 and the average family size was 2.71.

In the town, the population was spread out, with 17.9% under the age of 18, 14.2% from 18 to 24, 46.2% from 25 to 44, 18.0% from 45 to 64, and 3.7% who were 65 years of age or older. The median age was 31 years. For every 100 females, there were 129.8 males. For every 100 females age 18 and over, there were 130.6 males.

The median income for a household in the town was $38,173, and the median income for a family was $39,643. Males had a median income of $29,583 versus $26,346 for females. The per capita income for the town was $20,628.  About 11.1% of families and 8.8% of the population were below the poverty line, including 9.8% of those under age 18 and none of those age 65 or over.

Infrastructure

Transportation

Amtrak provides regular service to Fraser and nearby Winter Park (station code: WIP), operating its California Zephyr daily in each direction between Chicago, Illinois and Emeryville, California in the San Francisco Bay Area. In 2015, Amtrak also resumed seasonal ski train service to the Winter Park Resort. The new Winter Park Express resumed service ski train service that had been provided to resort by Denver and Rio Grande Western Railroad's Ski Train for nearly 70 years.

Notable people from Fraser
Carlota D. EspinoZa

See also

Byers Peak
Colorado
Bibliography of Colorado
Index of Colorado-related articles
Outline of Colorado
List of counties in Colorado
List of municipalities in Colorado
List of places in Colorado
Arapaho National Forest
Front Range
Saint Louis Creek

References

External links

Town of Fraser website
CDOT map of the Town of Fraser
History of Fraser

Towns in Grand County, Colorado
Towns in Colorado